The 1936–37 Czechoslovak Extraliga season was the first season of the Czechoslovak Extraliga, the top level of ice hockey in Czechoslovakia. Eight teams participated in the league, and LTC Prag won the championship.

Standings

External links
History of Czechoslovak ice hockey

Czechoslovak Extraliga seasons
Czech
1936 in Czechoslovak sport
1937 in Czechoslovak sport